Ford Motor Company Philippines, Inc. (FMCPI) is a Philippine-based subsidiary of Ford Motor Company. It was primarily focused on manufacturing automobiles for local and regional markets from 1998 until 2012. It built the Ford Escape, Ford Laser/Lynx,  Ford Focus, Mazda3, and Mazda Tribute for the Philippines, Thailand, Indonesia, Singapore, Malaysia and Vietnam. Since 2012, Ford Philippines imports the vehicles it sells to the Philippine market. These imports come mostly from Thailand and the United States.

History

Ford's history in the Philippines can be traced back to 1913 with the local assembly of the Ford Model T. In 1929, Henry Ford established Pilipinas Ford Car Works, Inc. (PFCW). In 1967, Ford Philippines, Inc. (FPI) was established as a subsidiary of the Ford Motor Company and began production operations on May 3, 1968, located at Sucat, Parañaque. In 1976, FPI inaugurated a body stamping plant in Mariveles, Bataan. On March 20, 1984, FPI formally and unexpectedly announced it would cease its operations in the Philippines by August 1984, in accordance with a decision reached by the management of Ford Motor Company.

In 1997, Ford returned to the Philippines with the establishment of Ford Motor Company Philippines, Inc. (FMCPI), introducing US-made vehicles such as the Expedition, the F-150, the Clubwagon and the Lincoln Town Car. A new P4 Billion state-of-the-art assembly plant in Santa Rosa, Laguna opened in September 1999. The first car manufactured at the plant was the Ford Lynx, and the company began building the Mazda-based Ford Ranger in March 2000. FMPCI company expanded its line-up with the introduction of the Escape SUV, Explorer SUV and Everest SUV. The Fiesta joined the local Ford line up in August 2010, this was followed by the Mustang in July 2012.

In 2012, Ford announced the consolidation of manufacturing operations in Southeast Asia and the cessation of operations at the Santa Rosa plant, citing "lack of supply base and economies of scale." 250 workers were affected by the decision, which Ford Philippines tried to resolve by offering them work at other Ford manufacturing facilities overseas. Despite this closure, Ford Philippines is opening more dealerships and expanding its vehicle lineup by the year 2015. In March 2014, Mitsubishi Motors Philippines Corporation announced it had acquired the former Ford assembly plant.

In early 2014, the subcompact EcoSport SUV was added to the local Ford lineup. In November 2019, Ford introduced the rear-wheel drive diesel Transit full-size van. In June 2020, the full-size F150 returned to the Philippines after a long hiatus.

Current models
Ford Mustang
Ford EcoSport
Ford Territory
Ford Everest
Ford Explorer
Ford Expedition
Ford Ranger
Ford F150
Ford Transit

Former models
The list only include vehicles that were sold after the brand's return in the Philippines in 1997. Therefore this list excludes all Ford vehicles sold in the Philippines before 1997.
Ford Escape (2003-2013 1st Gen, 2015-2016 Kuga-based)
Ford E-150 (1998-2014)
Ford Explorer Sport Trac (2001-2004)
Ford Fiesta (2010-2017)
Ford Focus (2005-2017)
Ford Lynx (1998-2005)
Lincoln Town Car (1998-2000)

References

External links
 

Ford Motor Company
Manufacturing companies of the Philippines
Philippine subsidiaries of foreign companies
Companies based in Muntinlupa
Vehicle manufacturing companies established in 1997
1997 establishments in the Philippines